Coed Rheidol National Nature Reserve forms part of the long ribbon of woodland adjoining the Afon Mynach and Afon Rheidol around the lower slopes of hills near Devil's Bridge, Ceredigion.

At the bottom of the gorge the woods take on an ancient appearance with their steep rocky slopes and gnarled trees dripping with moss. One of the most spectacular landscapes in Wales, fantastic views of the Rheidol waterfall and valley can be enjoyed at the top of this reserve.

External links
 

National nature reserves in Wales
Canyons and gorges of Ceredigion
Nature reserves in Ceredigion